Neotibicen davisi, known generally as the Davis' southeastern dog-day cicada or southern dog-day cicada, is a species of cicada in the family Cicadidae.

Subspecies
These two subspecies belong to the species Neotibicen davisi:
 Neotibicen davisi davisi (Smith, J.B. & Grossbeck, 1907) g b (Davis' southeastern dog-day cicada)
 Neotibicen davisi harnedi (Davis, 1918) b
Data sources: i = ITIS, c = Catalogue of Life, g = GBIF, b = Bugguide.net

References

Further reading

External links

 

Insects described in 1907
Cryptotympanini